His Children's Children is a lost 1923 American silent drama film directed by Sam Wood and starring the winsome Bebe Daniels. It is based on a novel, His Children's Children by Arthur Train. Famous Players-Lasky produced and Paramount Pictures distributed the film.

Cast
Bebe Daniels as Diane
James Rennie as Lloyd Maitland
Dorothy Mackaill as Sheila
Hale Hamilton as Rufus Kayne
George Fawcett as Peter B. Kayne
Kathryn Lean as Claudia
Mahlon Hamilton as Larry Devereaux
Mary Eaton as Mercedes
Warner Oland as Dr. Dahl
John Davidson as Florian
Lawrence D'Orsay as Mr. Pepperill
Sally Crute as Mrs. Wingate
Joseph Burke as Uncle Billy McGaw
Templar Powell as Lord Harrowdale
Dora Mills Adams as Mrs. Rufus Kayne
H. Cooper Cliffe as Attorney Krabfleisch

unbilled cast
Jack Oakie - 
Betty Bronson - 
Kit Wain

References

External links

Period advertisements for the film: newspaper advertisement, lobby poster

1923 films
American silent feature films
Lost American films
Films based on American novels
Films directed by Sam Wood
Paramount Pictures films
1923 drama films
Silent American drama films
American black-and-white films
Lost drama films
1923 lost films
1920s American films
1920s English-language films